Rugby League British Columbia (or the RLBC), formerly known as British Columbia Rugby League, is a non-profit organization and a member of Canada Rugby League.  RLBC operates a domestic rugby league football competition in British Columbia, Canada that currently features six teams with the addition of the Whistler Wolves for the 2020 season. The RLBC, with its clubs, additionally host events and competitions involving junior club teams and women's team to expand the sport of Rugby League in the province.

Teams

The RLBC competition started in May 2012 with 5 teams, Bayside Sharks, Burnaby Lake Rugby Club, Kelowna Crows, Sea to Sky Eagles and Surrey Beavers.  The RLBC operates such that its member clubs are responsible for developing teams for the purposes of competing against other clubs.  Since 2012, the men's competition has expanded to 6 teams making it the largest domestic rugby league competition in Canada.  The season includes the regular season, culminating in the Grand Final, and a Rugby league nines tournament prior to the regular season.

In 2020, the Vancouver Dragons and Valley Warriors developed women's teams and the RLBC was prepared for delivery of the country's first intraprovincial women's competition.  The clubs are the primary source for the province's representative teams.

History

In 2012, the Surrey Beavers played against Kelowna Crows in the Grand Final winning 20 to 4 to then go on to the Premier's Challenge to take on the BC Selects (reserve grade team of the BC Bulldogs). The BC Selects defeated Surrey Beavers 28 to 6.  Following the conclusion of the 2012 season, Burnaby Lake Rugby Club withdrew from the competition.

In 2013, RLBC announced the expansion of the competition to include a further 2 teams, Richmond Bears Rugby League Club and the Vancouver Dragons Rugby League Football Club.  However, the expansion was met with 4 of the original six Clubs stepping away from the competition (although 2 would return in the future).  The Grand Final pitted the previous season champions against the Sea to Sky Eagles-based out of Squamish.  The Surrey Beavers were victorious.

In 2015,  the Coastal Cougars (playing as the Capilano Cougars) were the top-placed team after going undefeated all season and  defeated the Vancouver Dragons in the Grand Final 30 to 6.

In 2016, the Coastal Cougars again went undefeated and won the Grand Final over the Abbotsford Griffins by a score of 48–12.

In 2017, the Coastal Cougars lost their 2nd week match meaning the end of a remarkable winning streak that took them through over 2 seasons and ultimately ended at 12 wins in a row.  In the Grand Final, the Valley Warriors laid claim to their first Grand Final Championship with a 20–0 win over the Kelowna Roosters, a founding member, who returned for play in 2017 and then subsequently ceased operations. 

In 2018, the Vancouver Dragons collected their first Grand Final Championship with a narrow 26 to 24 over perennial powerhouse Coastal Cougars.

In 2019, the Point Grey Thunder qualified for their first Grand Final after a semi-final win over the Valley Warriors by a score of 34–14.  In the final, however, they lost to the Coastal Cougars by a score of 38–28.

In 2020, the league expanded to include the Whistler Wolves and added two clubs, the Vancouver Dragons and Valley Warriors, established women's teams to compete.  As a consequence of the COVID-19 pandemic, the season was unable to start.

Structure and finance
Rugby League Clubs in the RLBC are incorporated societies and operate independently under the auspices of the RLBC and Canada Rugby League, or are post-secondary affiliated clubs.

Currently the RLBC is a self-funded entity and relies heavily on the contributions made by players and sponsors to help pay for the cost of league operations and representative teams.

Representative squads
RLBC players consist of the men's team, the British Columbia Bulldogs and women's team, the British Columbia Storm.  Players from the RLBC also make up the Western Canada Wild, a regional representative squad for the provinces of Manitoba, Alberta and British Columbia for both men and women.  In 2020, the Western Canada Wild met the representative team for Eastern Canada in the "Thunderdome" at Lamport Stadium in Toronto, Ontario. The "thunderdome" being an event similar to the popular State of Origin series in Australia in which the teams are composed of the best players representing regions.  In the inaugural Thunderdome, the Western Canada Wild women defeated Eastern Canada 24-18 while the men lost to Eastern Canada 14–44.

BC Bulldogs - Recent Fixtures

The roster for the BC Bulldogs against their provincial rival Alberta Broncos on September 2, 2018 is below.

BC Storm - Recent Fixtures

The roster for the BC Storm as of September 1, 2019 when they took on the Alberta Broncos is below.

See also

Alberta Rugby League
Ontario Rugby League
Rugby league in Canada
Ottawa Aces
Toronto Wolfpack

References

External links

Rugby league competitions in Canada
2011 establishments in British Columbia
Sports leagues established in 2011
Sports leagues in British Columbia